The name Congregation of the Holy Ghost applies to five Catholic Congregations: the Congregation of the Holy Spirit (Spiritans) and four female congregations:

 Congregation of the Holy Spirit (C.S.Sp.), also known as the Spiritans or Holy Ghost Fathers
 Daughters of the Holy Spirit, a worldwide order of nuns dedicated to education
 Sisters of the Holy Ghost (Dubuque), a congregation founded in 1890, by the Archbishop of Dubuque, Iowa, John Hennessey
 Missionary Sisters Servants of the Holy Spirit, the sister organisation of the Society of the Divine Word
 Sisters of the Holy Spirit and Mary Immaculate, established in 1886 at San Antonio, Texas